The Queensland Solo Championship is a motorcycle speedway championship held annually in Queensland to determine the Queensland State champion. The event is organised by the Motorcycling Queensland and is sanctioned by Motorcycling Australia (MA).

Keith Gurtner and John Titman head the list of Queensland Championship wins with seven each. 1986 Australian Champion Troy Butler and current (2014/15) champion Josh Grajczonek are next with six wins.

Five international riders have won the Queensland Solo title. Rune Sörmander (Sweden - 1954), Ivan Mauger (New Zealand - 1962), Ken McKinlay (Scotland - 1964), Oliver Allen (England - 2006) and Josh Auty (England - 2010).

Unless stated, all riders are from Queensland

Winners since 1927/28

References

External links
Honor Roll since 1927/28

Motorsport competitions in Australia
Speedway in Australia
Speedway